The M. A. Sargent Medal is awarded by Engineers Australia for longstanding eminence in science or the practice of electrical engineering. It is named in honour of Michael Anthony (Mike) Sargent, an outstanding Australian electrical engineer. The medal is the highest award of the Electrical College board of Engineers Australia,

Recipients 
Source:  Engineers Australia

 1989 Stuart G. Lister, State Electricity Commission of Queensland
 1990 Graham Goodwin, University of Newcastle, Australia
 1991 John Ness, MITEC Ltd
 1992 W. Derek Humpage, University of Western Australia
 1993 W. John Edwards, Industrial Automation Services Pty Ltd 
 1994 Martin Green,  University of New South Wales
 1995 Rodney Tucker,  University of Melbourne
 1996 Else Shepherd, Powerlink Queensland
 1997 John Hullett, Curtin University
 1998 John Richard (Rick) Gumley, Erico Lightning Technologies 
 1999 Michael Miller, University of South Australia
 2000 Mark Sceats,  University of Sydney 
 2001 No award
 2002 Brian D. O. Anderson, Australian National University
 2003 Henry d'Assumpcao, Defence Science and Technology Organisation
 2004 Richard Middleton, University of Newcastle, Australia
 2005 Noel Godfrey, Hatch Associates
 2006 Barry Inglis, CSIRO
 2007 Vic Gosbell, University of Wollongong
 2008 Keith Hilless, Zerogen Pty Ltd
 2009 No award
 2010 David James Skellern, Macquarie University
 2011 Paul Wilson, Queensland University of Technology
 2012 Trevor S. Bird, CSIRO
 2013 John O'Sullivan,  CSIRO
 2014 Don Sinnott,  Defence Science and Technology Organisation
 2015 David Sweeting University of Wollongong and Alex Zelinsky, Defence Science and Technology Organisation
 2016 Alan Finkel, Office of the Chief Scientist (Australia)
 2017 Hugh Durrant-Whyte,  The University of Sydney
 2018 Xinghuo Yu, RMIT University
 2019 Derek Abbott, University of Adelaide
 2020 Ian Hiskens, University of Michigan
 2021 Ian Webster, Ampcontrol  P/L and Qing-Long Han, Swinburne University
 2022 Tapan Saha, University of Queensland and Peng Shi, University of Adelaide

See also
 List of engineering awards
 List of awards named after people

References

Australian science and technology awards
Engineering awards
Awards established in 1989